Daria Leygonie-Fialko (maiden name Fialko; born July 9, 1979) is a Ukrainian media manager, producer and the founder of TV production company Space. Co-founder of The Organization of Ukrainian Producers.

Early life and education 
Daria was born on July 9, 1979, in Kyiv, in the family of theater critics. Father, Valery Oleksiyovych Fialko—Honored Art Worker of Ukraine, professor, head of the Department of Theater Studies, teacher of theatrical criticism and history of Russian cheater at Kyiv National I. K. Karpenko-Kary Theater, Cinema and Television University. Mother, Huievska Olga Yuriivna—theater expert, deputy director for research at The State Museum of Theater, Music and Cinema of Ukraine.

In 2001, Daria graduated from Taras Shevchenko National University of Kyiv, Faculty of Foreign Philology with a degree in Romano-Germanic Languages and Literature. In 2006, she received an MBA degree from the International Institute of Management (Ukraine-Switzerland) in the speciality "Foreign Economic Activity Management".

Career 
During her studies at the university, from 1997 to 1999, Daria worked as a journalist in the press service of the Ukrainian TV channel "1 + 1", at the same time she was an interpreter and moderator of press conferences at "Molodist" film festival.

From 2002 to 2005 Daria was the Head of Film Acquisitions at 1+1 TV channel, and in 2005 she became the Programming Director of this channel.

Three years later, in 2008, Daria started her work at the Star Media film company as the Producer-In-Chief of television projects. Among her projects are such popular Ukrainian shows as "Maidan's" and "Maidan's-2" on Inter TV channel, "People's Star-2" ("People's Star") and "People's Star-3" on "Ukraine" and others. In 2011 Daria has left the Star Media film company.

From December 2011 until August 2016, she was the General Manager of the Russian TV-channel TV-3.

From September 2016 until April 2018, Daria worked as the General Manager of CTC, the biggest entertainment channel in Russia.

In June 2018, Daria Leygonie-Fialko founded the TV production company Space together with her partner Katerina Laskari. Space has been created as a full-cycle production house, as well as a creative producer's centre, generating content for Ukraine and worldwide.

One of the first projects were the Ukrainian series "SLID" ("Trace") and "SLIPA" ("The Blind") for STB TV channel. The company produces comedies, detective stories, sports dramas, melodramas etc., such as "Nevirna" ("The Adulteress"), "Ridnya" ("The Kinfolk”), “Vodna polizia” ("Water Police”), "Last Axel", "DreamTeam" and others.

According to the independent study by MRM (Media Resources Management), Space Production became the leader in terms of the number of episodes produced for Ukrainian television in 2020.

In March 2022, together with other biggest names in Ukrainian TV production industry, Daria co-founded The Organization of Ukrainian Producers (OUP). The main task of OUP is to film documentary projects and feature films on Russian military aggression on the territory of Ukraine.

Personal life 
Married, her husband Antoine Leygonie-Fialko is French by nationality, the couple has two children.

Awards 
2013 — The Firm's Secret magazine named Daria Fialko "the youngest general director of a federal television channel in the Russian Federation"

2016 — "Anna The Detective" series - the winner of Film and Television Producers Association Award in the nomination "Best TV series (more than 24 episodes)"

2018 — the series "Flying Crew" - winner of TEFI-2018 award in the nomination "Television serial comedy / Sitcom"

Producer

Documentary 

2023 - Art in War (together Broadview TV for Arte TV channel)

TV series 
2022 — The Water Police («Ukraine TV channel»)

2021 — The Last Axel (original for MEGOGO online platform)

2021 — Unfaithful («STB»)

2020 — Folks («1+1»)

2020 until present — The Trace («STB»)

2020 until present — The Blind («STB»)

2018 — New Man («CTC»)

2018 — Girls Don't Give Up («CTC»)

2018 — Rocking Crew (Season 1) («CTC»)

2018 — Team B («CTC»)

2017 — Psychologists (Season 1) («CTC»)

2017-2018 — The Junior Team (seasons 5 and 6) («CTC»)

2017-2018 — The Ivanovs vs. The Ivanovs (seasons 1 and 2) («CTC»)

2017 — The Unknown («TV-3»)

2016 — Anna The Detective («TV-3»)

2014 — Thirteen («TV-3»)

2012-2016 — The Fifth Guard («TV-3»)

2008 — The Champion («TV-3»)

TV projects 
2011 — entertainment show Maidan's 2 («Inter»)

2011 — entertainment dancing show Maidan's («Inter»)

2011 — studio game show Women's Logic («1 + 1»)

2009 — talent show People's Star-3 («Ukraine TV channel»)

2008 — talent show People's Star-2 («Ukraine TV channel»)

2008 — magazine Galileo («К1»)

External links 
TBI — TBI’s 2023 Predictions: Daria Leygonie-Fialko, CEO SPACE Production & co-founder OUP // January 2022

Cineuropa — Daria Leygonie-Fialko and Kateryna Laskari spoke about the current state of Ukrainian TV production, the opening of their Paris-based office and the future of Ukraine’s audiovisual industry // June 2022

TVBIZZ Magazine — New Ukrainian Documentaries Tell the Stories of the War // June 2022

TBI — Telcos & Netflix disrupting business models amid scripted evolution // June 2022

"Media Heads" — "Space Production" founders about how media became life, the way to own business and the formula of success // December 2021

MBR — Producers, distributors and showrunners - about how to raise domestic series to a new level // October 2021

MBR — How Daria Fialko's production shoots Slid ("The Trace) series for STB // March 2020

MBR — Daria Leygonie-Fialko and her company Space Production launched pitching ideas // February 2020

References 

1979 births
Living people
Media executives
Ukrainian film producers
Ukrainian women film producers